Arylacetamide deacetylase-like 4 is a protein in humans that is encoded by the AADACL4 gene.

References

External links

Further reading